Gerard Barri Paytuví (born 2 January 2001) is a Spanish footballer who plays as a right back for Real Avilés CF, on loan from SD Huesca.

Club career
Born in Vallgorguina, Barcelona, Spain, Barri joined FC Barcelona's La Masia in June 2012, after representing CE Sant Celoni, PB Sant Celoni and FC Vallgorguina. He left the club in the following year, subsequently spending a year at EF Mataró before signing for RCD Espanyol in 2014.

In 2019, after finishing his formation, Barri moved to Elche CF and was assigned to the reserves in Tercera División. He made his senior debut on 31 August by starting in a 2–0 away win against CD Roda, and scored his first goal on 15 December, in a 3–2 win at UD Benigànim.

Barri made his professional debut on 16 January 2021, starting in a 0–2 loss at Rayo Vallecano, for the season's Copa del Rey. On 27 July, he moved to another reserve team, SD Huesca B in Segunda División RFEF.

On 19 January 2022, after just one match, Barri was loaned to Real Avilés CF also in the fourth tier, until June.

References

External links

2001 births
Living people
People from Vallès Occidental
Sportspeople from the Province of Barcelona
Spanish footballers
Footballers from Catalonia
Association football defenders
Segunda Federación players
Tercera División players
Elche CF Ilicitano footballers
Elche CF players
SD Huesca B players
SD Huesca footballers
Real Avilés CF footballers